K. V. Shanthi (June 25, 1937 – September 21, 2020) known by her stage name Shanthi was an Indian actress acted in Malayalam, Telugu, Hindi and Tamil movies. She was a prominent lead actress and dancer in Indian Cinema during the late 1950s, 1960s and 1970s. She appeared in famous Hindi films like Chori Chori of 1956.

Background
She was born at Samkranthi, Kottayam, Kerala, and later moved  to Chennai. She was married to Sasikumar and they had one son named Shyam Kumar. She was one of the permanent actresses of Merryland Studio's movies.  She has acted in more than 50 Malayalam movies and a few movies in Tamil, Kannada, Telugu and Hindi.

Filmography
Malayalam

 Kaamam Krodham Moham (1975)
 Akkaldaama (1975)
 Devi Kanyaakumaari (1974)
 Youvanam (1974) as Lakshmi
 Chanchala (1974)
 Nellu (1974)
 Kaadu (1973) as Ganga
 Professor (1972) as Vasumathi
 Prathikaram (1972) as Vimala
 C.I.D. In Jungle (1971)
 Aana Valarthiya Vaanampaadiyude Makan (1971)
 Kochaniyathi (1971) as Karthi
 Aval Alpam Vaikippoyi (1971)
 Madhuvidhu (1970) as Lakshmi
 Swapnangal (1970) as Rajamma's mother
 Aa Chithrashalabham Parannotte (1970)
 Chattambikkavala (1969) as Thresya
 Vila Kuranja Manushyan (1969)
 Nurse (1969)
 Urangatha Sundary (1969) as Prabhavathi
 Aalmaram (1969)
 Adhyaapika (1968)
 Kadal (1968) as Reetha
 Viplavakaarikal (1968) as Leela
 Hotel Highrange (1968) as Madhumathi/Gracy
 Lady Doctor (1967) as Marykutty
 Madatharuvi (1967)
 Karutha Rathrikal (1967)
 Postman (1967)
 Jeevikkaan Anuvadikku (1967)
 Puthri (1966) as Jessy
 Kallipennu (1966)
 Kaattumallika (1966)
 Kaliyodam (1965)
 Mayavi (1965) as Malathi/Jayanthi
 Pattuthoovala (1965) as Ameena
 Althaara (1964)
 Atom Bomb (1964) as Kamala
 Karutha Kai (1964) as Radha
 Snapaka Yohannan (1963) as Esther
 Doctor (1963) as Seetha
 Kalayum Kaaminiyum (1963)
 Kaattumaina (1963)
 Snehadeepam (1962) as Prabha
 Sreekovil (1962)
 Shree Rama Pattabhishekam (1962)
 Arappavan (1961) as Ammini
 Bhakta Kuchela (1961) as Sathyabhama
 Poothali (1960)
 Aana Valarthiya Vaanampaadi (1959)
 Mariakutty (1958) as Ruby
 Lilly (1958)
 Padatha Painkili (1957) as Lusie
 Minnunnathellam Ponnalla (1957) as Leela
 Achanum Makanum (1957) as Srikala
 Jailppulli (1957) as Prema
 Ponkathir (1953) as a dancer

Other Languages

Chori Chori (1956) – Hindi

Penn Kulathin Pon Vilakku (1959) - Tamil 

Marutha Nattu Veeran (1961) – Tamil

Ellam Unakkaga (1961) – Tamil

Aadi Perukku (film) (1962) – Tamil

B. Vittalacharya's Telugu movies

References

External links
 
 K. V. Shanthi at MSI

Actresses in Malayalam cinema
Indian film actresses
Actresses from Kottayam
1937 births
2020 deaths
20th-century Indian actresses
Actresses in Tamil cinema
Actresses in Hindi cinema